Justin "Sambo" Sampson (born 2 September 1966) is a sports television personality, professional speaker and former Australian rugby union player.  Sampson has played representative rugby with New South Wales Country and North Harbour.  He was an accomplished rugby coach, having coached the Singapore and the Indonesian national teams and has traveled worldwide conducting coaching clinics, fundraising activities and other events to help promote the sport of rugby.  He is also a rugby commentator and presenter covering international matches on networks such as ESPN Star Sports and ABC TV (Australia).

Early life and education
Sampson grew up on a sheep and cattle station near the town of Cobar, in western New South Wales, and attended the Shore School in Sydney.  As a team captain, Sampson's style and leadership qualities earned him selections as vice-captain on both the Combined G.P.S. and the NSW Schoolboys First XV representative sides in 1985.  After secondary school, Sampson went on to graduate from Mitchell College Bathurst in 1989.

Rugby career

Playing career
Sampson played provincial representative rugby for Country Origin, North Harbour in Sydney (1991–92), as well  New South Wales Country, where he played against the All Blacks in 1988 and British Lions in 1989.
He was also captain of his 1st Division club, Northern Suburbs in Sydney for three years from 1990 to 1993. In 1990 Sampson was a runner up in The Sydney Morning Herald Best and Fairest Award, as well as runner up for the Rothmans Medal in 1991.

Coaching career
From 1993 to 1996 Sampson lived in Japan and played professional rugby with the Kubota Spears in Tokyo as well as serving as their coach. Sampson began assistant coaching duties with the Singapore national rugby team in 1996.  He was later appointed to head coach, with Australia's David Campese taking over as assistant coach in 1998.  He remained with Singapore until 2000 and returned again to coach in 2002.

In 2007, Sampson was signed to the coaching staff for the Indonesian national rugby team.  Serving alongside former Wallaby Duncan Hall, Jr. and Singapore's Ismail Kadir.  With Sampson part of the coaching staff, Indonesia went 4–2 in international test matches earning them a promotion to Division 3 for the 2009 Asian Five Nations.

Professional career
Since 1997, Sampson has commentated for the World Rugby Sevens Series in Dubai, Hong Kong, Singapore and Malaysia. Furthermore, Sampson has commentated for ABC TV (Australia), along with RTHK Radio for the Hong Kong Sevens. In addition, Sampson was the main presenter for the Victoria Rugby Union's new weekly club rugby show on Channel 31 (Australia), called Rugby Time. Sampson has also written articles for The New Paper in Singapore, and for espnstar.com.

Sampson first appeared on ESPN Star Sports during the 1999 Rugby World Cup, as an expert rugby commentator and presenter, including  Super Rugby, Six Nations Championship, Tri-Nations and Rugby World Cup tournaments.  Sampson was part of a weekly panel of commentators for The Rugby Show and also served as Director of Advertising and Sales for Southeast Asia.  He continued to commentate with Star Sports until 2007.

In 2006, Sampson established Sampson Marketing Services, a company that provides support on sponsorship, event management and corporate hospitality.  Sampson is a prominent speaker, master of ceremonies and celebrity auctioneer and works with a variety of global and local organizations throughout Asia, Australia and the Middle East.

As one of the more recognized rugby pundits, Sampson travels worldwide to promote the sport of rugby by conducting coaching clinics, fundraising activities and other events for local and national Rugby Unions.

References

1966 births
Australian rugby union commentators
Australian television personalities
Australian auctioneers
Australian rugby union players
Australian rugby union coaches
People from New South Wales
Living people
Rugby union forwards
Rugby union players from New South Wales